A motion for judgment as a matter of law (JMOL) is a motion made by a party, during trial, claiming the opposing party has insufficient evidence to reasonably support its case.  JMOL is also known as a directed verdict, which it has replaced in American federal courts.

JMOL is similar to judgment on the pleadings and summary judgment, all of which test the factual sufficiency of a claim.  Judgment on the pleadings is a motion made after pleading and before discovery; summary judgment happens after discovery and before trial; JMOL occurs during trial.

In United States federal courts, JMOL is a creation of Rule 50 of the Federal Rules of Civil Procedure. JMOL is decided by the standard of whether a reasonable jury could find in favor of the party opposing the JMOL motion. If there is no evidence to support a reasonable conclusion for the opposing party, judgment is entered by the court and the case is over. If there is sufficient evidence to make a reasonable conclusion in favor of the opposing party, but there is equally strong evidence to support an opposite conclusion, the party with the burden of persuasion fails.

Timing is very important in making a motion for JMOL; the motion can be made only after the opposing party has presented its case. In civil cases, the plaintiff presents its case, the defendant presents its case, and the plaintiff may present a rebuttal. Therefore, once the plaintiff has presented its case, the defendant but not the plaintiff can move for JMOL. However, once the defendant has finished presenting its case, both the plaintiff and the defendant can move for JMOL.

JMOL motions may also be made after the verdict is returned and are then called "renewed" motions for judgment as a matter of law (RJMOL), but the motion is still commonly known by its former name, judgment notwithstanding the verdict, or JNOV (from the English judgment and the Latin non obstante veredicto).

See also
Judgment notwithstanding the verdict
New trial
No case to answer
Renewed judgment as a matter of law
Summary judgment

References

United States civil procedure
Matter of law
American legal terminology